The Milwaukee Admirals are a professional ice hockey team in the American Hockey League (AHL). They play in Milwaukee, Wisconsin, United States, at the University of Wisconsin–Milwaukee Panther Arena. They are affiliated with the NHL's Nashville Predators.

The team has been playing since 1970, originally as an amateur team called the Milwaukee Wings, but were renamed as the Admirals after their first season. They played an independent schedule until joining the semiprofessional United States Hockey League (USHL) in 1973. In 1977, the Admirals joined the International Hockey League (IHL) when the USHL transitioned to a junior league. When the IHL ceased operations in 2001, the Admirals joined the AHL.

History

Independent era
The Admirals first took to the ice in the winter of 1970 as an amateur club known as the Milwaukee Wings. Sponsored by the Wisconsin Citizens Benefit Association, they lost their first game on January 25 when the Madison All-Stars beat them 17–7. They got their first win five days later when they defeated the Milwaukee Winter Club 10–8. They finished the season with 8 wins and 7 loses.

The next year the team was sold by the original owner Reed Fansher to a group of investors. One of the investors, Erwin J. Merar, owned an appliance store and the team was renamed the "Admirals" after a brand of household appliances sold in Merar's store.

United States Hockey League era
Beginning with the 1973–74 season the Admirals joined the United States Hockey League. Their first season in a league was not particularly successful as they ended the season in last place in their division. They won only 11 games, lost 35, and tied two games that season.

The Admirals won the USHL league championship in 1976, winning seven straight games in the league's playoffs. In the off-season, the team was purchased by former Chicago Blackhawks announcer Lloyd Pettit and his wife, Jane Bradley Pettit.

International Hockey League era
For the 1977–78 season the Admirals joined the International Hockey League as the USHL was becoming a strictly amateur league. The Admirals appeared in the IHL's Turner Cup finals only once (1983), where they lost to Toledo in six games.

American Hockey League era 
The Admirals, along with five other IHL franchises, joined the American Hockey League for the 2001–02 season when the IHL ceased operations. The team was allowed to keep their nickname despite the presence of the Norfolk Admirals in the AHL, as Milwaukee had used the nickname since 1970, well before the Norfolk team was established as the Hampton Roads Admirals in the ECHL. (In the 2015–16 season, that AHL franchise moved to the AHL's Pacific Division as the fourth incarnation of the San Diego Gulls, and a Norfolk club was re-established in the ECHL.)

They won their first Calder Cup in 2004 when they defeated the Wilkes-Barre/Scranton Penguins. Prior to the finals, Milwaukee needed seven games to defeat the Cincinnati Mighty Ducks in the first round. Then the Admirals defeated the Chicago Wolves in six games to advance to the conference finals. The Admirals then eliminated the Rochester Americans four games to one. Milwaukee went on to sweep the Wilkes-Barre/Scranton Penguins to win the Calder Cup. The Admirals completed a rare postseason run in which they needed one fewer game to eliminate their opponents in each subsequent series.

The Admirals were purchased in June 2005 by a group of investors, led by Harris J. Turer, including Milwaukee Brewers owner Mark Attanasio, assistant general manager Gord Ash, and pitcher Ben Sheets.  The Brewers subsequently became the sole uniform sponsor of the Admirals, and the Admirals wear a Brewers logo patch on their sweaters.

The Admirals won their second division title as a member of the American Hockey League in 2006, clinching the title on the last day of their schedule with a win over the Grand Rapids Griffins.

In the 2006 Calder Cup playoffs after narrowly winning a seven-game playoff series over the Iowa Stars, Milwaukee swept both the Houston Aeros and Grand Rapids Griffins to advance to their second Calder Cup final series. To their disappointment, the Admirals would lose in six games to the Hershey Bears.

On August 1, 2006, the Admirals unveiled a new logo and a change in color scheme from the traditional red-and-blue to black, white, and light blue. They used this logo until 2015, when the Admirals unveiled another new logo, keeping the Lake Michigan blue from 2006, but replaced black with navy blue.  Also, the skeleton motif was kept with the hat that adorns the skeleton's head as a callback to the Admirals logos used from 1976 to 1997. This logo received very positive reviews, resulting in it becoming SportsLogos.net's 2015 Best New Primary Logo of the Year.

On March 16, 2016, Milwaukee Admirals owner/CEO Harris Turer along with Wisconsin Center District (WCD) announced that the Admirals signed a 10-year contract, bringing the Admirals to the University of Wisconsin–Milwaukee Panther Arena for the 2016-17 AHL season. This 10-year contract also results in a $6.4 million investment to bring the arena up to AHL standards with the Admirals contributing two million and the rest being supplied by the Wisconsin Center District.

The team won its second regular season championship in the 2019–20 season, which was curtailed by the COVID-19 pandemic. Due to the ongoing restrictions during the pandemic, the Admirals were one of three teams that opted out of the 2020–21 AHL season. After the Admirals announced their season was cancelled, team ownership also announced that all of their full-time employees would still be paid for the year.

Team information

League membership 
 1970–1973: independent
1973–1977: United States Hockey League
1977–2001: International Hockey League
2001–present: American Hockey League

NHL affiliation
The Admirals have been the top-level affiliate of the Nashville Predators since that team's founding in 1998. On February 22, 2010, the clubs signed a new agreement that extended that relationship through the 2011–12 season with a mutual option for 2012–13. 

Coincidentally, the two cities' baseball franchises share a reverse affiliation, as the Nashville Sounds are the Triple-A affiliate of the Milwaukee Brewers.

During the 2006–07 season, the Admirals were also part of an unusual affiliation agreement with the Edmonton Oilers, who used five partial affiliates in the AHL for the 2006–07 season. These five affiliates included the Milwaukee Admirals, the Grand Rapids Griffins, the Iowa Stars, the Wilkes-Barre/Scranton Penguins, and the Hamilton Bulldogs. This arrangement lasted one season, as the Oilers announced a three-year affiliation with the Springfield Falcons on March 19, 2007.

Logos 
The following primary logos from 1970–Present.

Alternative logos 
The following alternative logos from 2006–Present.

Mascot 
 

During the 1998 Admirals rebranding efforts, the Admirals created a new mascot, named Roscoe. Roscoe is a "sea dog"-like animal with bright orange fur, a hockey puck-shaped nose, and wears a bicorne admiral's hat along with an Admirals jersey with the number 98, representing the year Roscoe joined the Admirals organization.

At times during breaks and intermission, Roscoe will also ride a zamboni modified to look like a pirate ship. When interacting with fans, Roscoe will sometimes take souvenir hockey pucks from fans and place them on his nose.

In 2014, when the Nashville Predators' mascot, Gnash, got injured, Roscoe was "called up" to the Predators and to the NHL, joining with other mascots to entertain fans in Nashville while Gnash recovered.

Season-by-season results
Legend:  – round did not exist at the time

Players

Current roster
Updated March 19, 2023.

|}

Team captains

Neil Meadmore, 1987–88
Peter Bakovic, 1988–1991
Gino Cavallini, 1994–1996
Tony Hrkac, 1996–97
Jeff Nelson, 1997–1999
Marc Moro, 1999–2001
Andy Berenzweig, 2002–03
Ray Schultz, 2003–04
Tony Hrkac, 2004–05
Greg Zanon, 2005–06
Sheldon Brookbank, 2006–07
Alex Henry, 2007–08
Nolan Yonkman, 2008–2010
Brett Palin, 2010–11
Scott Ford, 2011–12, 2013–14
Mike Moore, 2012–13
Joe Piskula, 2014–15
Colton Sissons, 2015–16
Trevor Smith, 2016–2018
Jarred Tinordi, 2018–2020
Cole Schneider, 2021–present

Retired numbers

Notable alumni

Gary Agnew
Shawn Antoski
Sheldon Brookbank
Wade Brookbank
Marc Crawford
Jeff Daniels
Scott Darling
Peter DeBoer
Martin Erat
Kelly Fairchild
Filip Forsberg
Blake Geoffrion
Don Gibson
Adam Hall
Dan Hamhuis
Patric Hornqvist
Jim Johannson
Roman Josi
Claude Julien
David Legwand
Bob Mason
Chris Mason
Cal O'Reilly
Gino Odjick
Darren Pang
Pete Peeters
Rich Peverley
Yves Preston
Alexander Radulov
Pekka Rinne
Ken Sabourin
Mike Santorelli
Buzz Schneider
Ronnie Stern
Ryan Suter
Jordin Tootoo
Kimmo Timonen
Steve Tuttle
Scottie Upshall
Tomas Vokoun
Shea Weber
Colin Wilson
Dale Yakiwchuk
Greg Zanon

Team records

Single season
 Goals: Danny Lecours, 75, (1982–83)
 Assists: Dale Yakiwchuk, 100, (1982–83)
 Points: Dale Yakiwchuk, 138, (1982–83)
 Penalty minutes: Don Gibson, 381, (1992–93)
 GAA: Connor Ingram, 1.92, (2019–20)
 SV%: Connor Ingram, .933, (2019–20)

Career
 Career goals: Danny Lecours, 445
 Career assists: Fred Berry, 379
 Career points: Danny Lecours, 814
 Career penalty minutes: Ken Sabourin, 1233
 Career goaltending wins: Rich Sirois, 119 
 Career shutouts: Brian Finley, 11
 Career games: Danny Lecours, 641

References

External links
 
 The Internet Hockey Database - Milwaukee Admirals (AHL)
 The Internet Hockey Database - Milwaukee Admirals (IHL)
 The Internet Hockey Database - Milwaukee Admirals (USHL)
 The Internet Hockey Database - Milwaukee Admirals (Independent)

 
Boston Bruins minor league affiliates
Chicago Blackhawks minor league affiliates
Nashville Predators minor league affiliates
Vancouver Canucks minor league affiliates
Ice hockey teams in Wisconsin
Ice hockey clubs established in 1970
1970 establishments in Wisconsin